TourRadar is a privately held global company headquartered in Vienna, Austria that operates an online marketplace and internet booking engine, specializing in multi-day tours.

Product overview 
TourRadar's global inventory includes over 40,000 different multi-day tours including those related to adventure, food, river-cruising, hiking and trekking, and several other types of travel styles.

History
Founded in 2010, TourRadar was created by Australian brothers Travis and Shawn Pittman and was inspired by their social travel website BugBitten. TourRadar was spun-out of Bugbitten in June 2010 and has since grown to include the ability to find, book and review multi-day tours.

In June 2013, TourRadar announced a round of angel funding from investors including Erik Blachford, the former CEO of Expedia.

In May 2014, TourRadar appeared on 2 Minuten, 2 Millionen, and secured US$500,000 in funding led by former chief executives from Expedia and the HolidayCheck Group, as well as funding from a private Austrian investment company.

In September 2015, TourRadar launched in North America, establishing an office in Toronto, Canada, and named Christian Wolters, former VP of Sales and Marketing at Intrepid Travel, as the company's North America Managing Director.

In May, 2016, TourRadar raised $6 million in Series A funding. In September of the same year, the company announced that it would be adding river cruising to its catalogue of bookable tours.

In October 2017, TourRadar completed a Series B funding round of $10 million. Later that year, TourRadar was named one of the top three start-ups in Austria by Trend.

In June 2018, TourRadar raised $50 million in Series C funding, led by Silicon Valley growth venture capital firm, TCV, who previously backed Expedia and Airbnb. The funding also included participation from existing investors Cherry Ventures, Endeit Capital, Hoxton Ventures and Speedinvest.

In February 2019, TourRadar launched a contest called Tour the World which included a global search for two strangers willing to travel the world together for 50 days. The winners had their experiences documented by a film crew while they traveled to five different continents.

In 2020, during the COVID-19 pandemic, The Observer gave TourRadar one of eight awards for the year's "worst customer service". TourRadar's employees had told a customer whose holiday was cancelled due to travel restrictions to agree to a credit note instead of a refund, then, after she claimed a refund through her credit card issuer, threatened to hold her responsible for cancelling her holiday and attempted to pressure her into dropping her claim. TourRadar stated that it had only provided "recommendations". Other similar companies were offering credit notes due to the impact of the COVID-19 pandemic on tourism, and travel bookers were themselves awaiting refunds from overseas tour operators and their vendors.

In 2021, TourRadar announced its Adventure Booking Platform category which allows travel agents to earn a commission on multi-day tours.

In 2022, TourRadar formed a partnership with Flight Centre to integrate its inventory and bookable online content into Flight Centre's Helio agent platform via API.

Offices
TourRadar has offices in Brisbane, Australia; Vienna, Austria; and Toronto, Canada.

References

External links 
 

Online travel agencies
Austrian travel websites
Travel and holiday companies of Austria
Travel and holiday companies of Australia
Travel and holiday companies of Canada
Companies based in Vienna